Sallie Patrick is an American screenwriter and television producer. She was the co-creator, executive producer, and showrunner of Dynasty, a 2017 reboot of the 1980s series of the same name.

Early life
Patrick grew up in Atlanta, Georgia.

Career
Patrick began her career as a writer for television series like Dirty Sexy Money and Life Unexpected. She was later a writer and producer on Revenge and Limitless.

In September 2016, Patrick was announced as executive producer and showrunner for the then-upcoming Dynasty reboot series. Deadline Hollywood reported in May 2019 that co-executive producer Josh Reims would succeed Patrick as showrunner for season three.

Credits

References

External links
 

20th-century American women writers
20th-century American writers
American screenwriters
American soap opera writers
American television producers
American women television producers
American women screenwriters
Living people
Women soap opera writers
Year of birth missing (living people)
21st-century American women